is a former Japanese football player.

Playing career
Nishijima was born in Kawai, Nara on April 7, 1982. After graduating from high school, he joined J1 League club Sanfrecce Hiroshima in 2001. However he could not play at all in the match until 2003. Although he moved to Vissel Kobe in 2004, he could not play at all in the match. In September 2004, he moved to J2 League club Consadole Sapporo. He became a regular player as left defender of three backs defense and played all matches until end of the season. Although his opportunity to play decreased for injuries from 2005, he became a regular player again from summer 2006. Consadole won the champions in 2007 season and was promoted to J1. Although Consadole was relegated to J2 in a year, he played many matches as mainly side back until 2010. In 2011, he moved to Tokushima Vortis. He played as regular side back in 2 seasons. In 2013, he moved to Yokohama FC. Although he played in 2 seasons, he could not play many matches. In 2015, he moved to Giravanz Kitakyushu. He played many matches in 2015 season. However his opportunity to play decreased from 2016 and Giravanz was also relegated to J3 League end of 2016 season. He retired end of 2017 season.

Club statistics

References

External links

1982 births
Living people
Association football people from Nara Prefecture
Japanese footballers
J1 League players
J2 League players
J3 League players
Sanfrecce Hiroshima players
Vissel Kobe players
Hokkaido Consadole Sapporo players
Tokushima Vortis players
Yokohama FC players
Giravanz Kitakyushu players
Association football defenders